Fernando Casartelli (born 13 October 1976 in Villa Ángela) is a former Argentine footballer who last played for Brest. He retired in 2008, at the age of 31 for medical reasons.

His brother Carlos is a footballer.

External links

1976 births
Living people
Argentine footballers
Gimnasia y Esgrima de Jujuy footballers
Amiens SC players
Stade Brestois 29 players
People from Villa Ángela
Association football defenders
Sportspeople from Chaco Province